The Dodo was a satirical, sometimes underground military humor magazine published by cadets at the United States Air Force Academy. It often pokes fun at Air Force and Academy policies and leadership, and is often very cynical in nature. The magazine's name is a play on the Academy's official mascot, the falcon.

Since its founding in 1957, The Dodo has gone through cycles of legitimacy. At times it has been sanctioned and censored by Academy leadership.  Other times, the attitude of the magazine has led to it being banned outright—usually driving publication underground.

eDodo 
In the mid-90s, censorship of The Dodo drove the development of an online version of the magazine called eDodo, run by graduates who were no longer subject to the military authority at the Academy. The eDodo bulletin boards were frequented by Academy graduates, cadets, and at least a handful of non-graduates, but Academy officials publicly distanced themselves from the eDodo.

External links
 The Dodo Lives, an electronic archive of the original Dodo

References

United States Air Force Academy
Military humor
Magazines established in 1957
Satirical magazines published in the United States
Military magazines published in the United States